Oxana Vasilievna Kharissova (born 1969) is a Ukrainian–Mexican nanoscientist whose research involves the synthesis and solubility of nanoparticles. She is a professor and researcher in the faculty of physical and mathematical sciences at the Autonomous University of Nuevo León.

Education and career
Kharissova was born in 1969 in Ukraine, then part of the Soviet Union. She earned a bachelor's degree in geochemistry in 1993 and a master's degree in crystallography in 1994, both from Moscow State University, before emigrating to Mexico in 1995 and later becoming a Mexican citizen. She has a 2001 Ph.D. in materials science from the Autonomous University of Nuevo León, where she is a professor and researcher.

Books
Kharissova is a co-author or co-editor of books including:
Handbook of Less-Common Nanostructures (with Boris I. Kharisov and Ubaldo Ortiz-Mendez, CRC Press, 2012)
Solubilization and Dispersion of Carbon Nanotubes (with Boris I. Kharisov, Springer, 2017)
Carbon Allotropes: Metal-Complex Chemistry, Properties and Applications (with Boris I. Kharisov, Springer, 2019)

Recognition
Kharissova is a member of the Mexican Academy of Sciences, elected in 2010. In 2017 the Autonomous University of Nuevo León gave her their "Flama, Vida y Mujer" recognition, in the area of teaching and research.

References

External links

1969 births
Living people
Ukrainian emigrants
Immigrants to Mexico
Naturalized citizens of Mexico
Nanotechnologists
20th-century Mexican scientists
20th-century Ukrainian scientists
Moscow State University alumni
Autonomous University of Nuevo León alumni
Academic staff of the Autonomous University of Nuevo León
Members of the Mexican Academy of Sciences
21st-century Mexican scientists
20th-century Ukrainian women scientists
20th-century Mexican women scientists
21st-century Mexican women scientists